Lund Church is a parish church of the Church of Norway in Lund Municipality in Rogaland county, Norway. It is located in the village of Moi. It is the church for the Lund parish which is part of the Dalane prosti (deanery) in the Diocese of Stavanger. The white, wooden church was built in a long church style in 1808 using designs by an unknown architect. The church seats about 420 people.

History
The earliest existing historical records of the church date back to the year 1409. The first church was likely a stave church. In 1618, the church was described as a small long church when records show that major roof repairs were carried out. Then in 1630, the nave of the church was renovated and enlarged. In 1808, the church was torn down and a new, larger church was constructed on the same site using many of the same materials that were salvaged from the old church. The new church was consecrated on 23 September 1812 by the Bishop Christian Sørenssen.

See also
List of churches in Rogaland

References

Lund, Norway
Churches in Rogaland
Wooden churches in Norway
19th-century Church of Norway church buildings
Churches completed in 1808
14th-century establishments in Norway